Kim Seong-eun (김성은, 10 June 1943 – 2007) was a South Korean boxer. He competed in the men's featherweight event at the 1968 Summer Olympics.

References

1943 births
2007 deaths
South Korean male boxers
Olympic boxers of South Korea
Boxers at the 1968 Summer Olympics
Asian Games medalists in boxing
Boxers at the 1966 Asian Games
Boxers at the 1970 Asian Games
Asian Games gold medalists for South Korea
Medalists at the 1966 Asian Games
Medalists at the 1970 Asian Games
Featherweight boxers
People from Jeju Province
Sportspeople from Jeju Province